The Shapoorji Pallonji National Academy or National Cricket Academy is a cricket academy and training centre based at the Malahide Cricket Club Ground  in Malahide, Dublin, Ireland. The centre was sponsored by the Shapoorji Pallonji Group.

The NCA was officially opened in 2013 with 10 years deal with Indian business conglomerate Shapoorji Pallonji Group which is owned by the Pallonji Mistry family who Irish citizens to promote cricket in Ireland. It was designed to be a finishing school for leading young male and female players who are identified as having the potential to represent the Ireland cricket team. The initial intake comprised 22 Irish players from the ages of 15.

Current recruits

Men's 

 Mark Adair
 Rory Anders
 Peter Chase
 Rishi Chopra
 Varun Chopra
 Scott Campbell
 Jack Carson
 Sonny Cott
 Colin Currie
 David Delany
 Adam Dennison
 Peter Eakin
 Jamie Grassi
 Ryan Hunter
 Josh Little
 Tyrone Kane
 Gary McClintock
 Will McClintock
 James McCollum
 Harry Tector
 Jack Tector
 Morgan Topping
 Lorcan Tucker
 Fiachra Tucker
 Ben White

Women's 

 Kim Garth
 Fiona Gill
 Gaby Lewis
 Lucy O'Reilly
 Elena Tice

Coaching staff

 Head coach: Peter Johnston

References

External links
 Shapoorji Pallonji Cricket Ireland Academy
 Cricket Ireland official

2013 establishments in Ireland
Cricket academies
Cricket in Ireland
National Cricket Academy